Holton-Arms is an independent college-preparatory school for girls in grades 3–12, located in Bethesda, Maryland. As of the 2021–22 school year, there were 667 students and 94 faculty. Since 2007, Susanna Jones has been Head of School.

The school has three divisions, Lower School (grades 3–6), Middle School (7–8), and Upper School (9–12). Tuition for 2022-23 is $50,375 for grades 3-12.  In 2021–2022, the financial aid budget was $5 million.

History 
In 1901, Jessie Moon Holton and Carolyn Hough Arms founded Holton-Arms School. The school was located at 2125 S Street, NW, Washington, D.C.

Holton-Arms moved to Bethesda in 1963. Its facilities include a science wing and lecture hall, two libraries, a performing arts center with a 400-seat theater and new black box theater, art and ceramic studios (with a kiln) and photo lab, three dance studios, a double gymnasium, an indoor competition-size pool, a weight and training room, and dining room renovated in 2012. Outdoor facilities include seven tennis courts, an eight-lane all-weather track, and three athletic fields, including a synthetic turf field.

The School's mission is to cultivate the unique potential of young women through the “education not only of the mind, but of the soul and spirit.” (Jessie Moon Holton, 1866–1951). The School's motto is Inveniam viam aut faciam—I will find a way or make one.

Athletics
In the Upper School, Holton-Arms competes in the Independent School League. Holton-Arms has over 50 different teams and competes in 15 sports.

Notable alumnae 

 Susan Ford Bales, author, photojournalist, former chair of the board of the Betty Ford Center, and daughter of former United States President Gerald Ford
 Katharine Byron, former United States congressional representative for Maryland
 Shelley Moore Capito, United States senator for West Virginia
 Juliette Crosby, actress
 Beka Economopoulos, artist, environmental activist, and co-organizer of the March for Science in 2017
 Christine Blasey Ford, professor of psychology and research psychologist
 Christine Lagarde, former managing director of the International Monetary Fund
 Julia Louis-Dreyfus, actress
 Elizabeth MacRae, actress
 Terrell McSweeny, attorney and former commissioner of the Federal Trade Commission
 Jacqueline Kennedy Onassis, writer, editor, photographer, and first lady of the United States from 1961 to 1963
 Alex Poon, LGBTQ advocate
 Patricia Richardson, actress
 Margaret Warner, reporter and senior correspondent for the PBS NewsHour
 Dede Wilsey, philanthropist, socialite, and chair emeritus of the Fine Arts Museums of San Francisco.
 Elinor Wylie, poet and novelist
 Rachael Yamagata, musician

See also
 1975 Holton-Arms School senior prom

References

External links 

Preparatory schools in Maryland
Educational institutions established in 1901
Schools in Bethesda, Maryland
Independent School League
Girls' schools in Maryland
Private high schools in Montgomery County, Maryland
Private middle schools in Montgomery County, Maryland
Private elementary schools in Montgomery County, Maryland
1901 establishments in Maryland